The Class 900 was a class of steam tender locomotives for freight trains with 2-8-2 wheel arrangement operated by the Chōsen Railway (Chōtetsu) in colonial Korea. They were the largest 2-8-2 steam locomotives ever built for  narrow-gauge railways.

Description
After the completion of the Ryesong River bridge in 1932, Chōtetsu's Hwanghae Line network took on greater significance as a direct route between Gyeongseong and Haeju, capital of Hwanghae Province, was opened. As a result, the increased production of rice, iron ore, and limestone, coupled with the development of Haeju Port, led to a dramatic increase in traffic volumes. This led to many proposals to convert the line to standard gauge. Since this would entail enormous costs and years of work, it was decided to further increase the transportation capacity of the narrow-gauge line. To this end, studies were conducted to determine the largest possible size a 762mm narrow-gauge locomotive could be, result in the design of what would become the world's largest 2-8-2 tender locomotive for  narrow gauge.

In charge of the design team assigned to the project was Takao Takada, for whom this was his maiden project, and who had numerous challenges to address. Because of the narrow gauge, the position of the boiler could not be raised. Since the space between the main frame is also narrow, cast-steel cross beams were inserted between the main frame and the rear frame, which gave more space to install the firebox. This was the first time this technique was used by a Japanese manufacturer.

Despite having a very long wheelbase, the Class 900 could pass through curves of  radius. To ensure that this would allow the locomotive to clear a curve of such small diameter, at the suggestion of Kisha Seizō chairman Yasujirō Shima, a full-size wooden mockup of the locomotive was built and tested on a curved track.

These were joined by three more built in the same year by Nippon Sharyō, numbers 907 through 909. In 1944, a further four were added, two from Kisha Seizō (numbers 910–911, works numbers 2353-2354) and three from Hitachi (numbers 912-914). Locomotives of this design were later built by Nippon Sharyō for the Taiwan Railway Bureau for use on the Taitung Line.

Postwar
After the Liberation and partition of Korea, these locomotives were divided between the Korean State Railway of North Korea and the Korean National Railroad of South Korea. The three Hitachi-built units are known to have operated with the KNR, which designated them 혀기11 (Hokey11) class and numbered 혀기11-12(Hokey11-12), 혀기11-13(Hokey11-13) and 혀기11-14(Hokey11-14); all three are preserved.

References

Locomotives of Korea
Locomotives of North Korea
Locomotives of South Korea
Railway locomotives introduced in 1935
2-8-0 locomotives
Kisha Seizo locomotives
Narrow gauge steam locomotives of Korea
Chosen Railway